John Van Nest Talmage (18 August 1819 – 19 August 1892), was a Protestant Christian missionary to Amoy, Fujian, China.  He was sent by the Reformed Church in America from 1847 to 1890.

Biography
His younger brother Thomas De Witt Talmage was also a clergyman, and his family, within the Reformed tradition, migrated to North America from the Netherlands.  His father's family had emigrated from England, and were the founders of the towns of South Hampton, and East Hampton in New York.

Works

He is memorialized in the classic work Forty Years in China, which was written by Rev. John Gerardus Fagg in 1894, a biography genre.

References

External links 
Talmage Biography (Pitcher, 1893)
 
 
 Talmage Biography-Forty Years in South China(Fagg, 1894)

1819 births
1892 deaths
People from Bound Brook, New Jersey
People from Somerville, New Jersey
American people of Dutch descent
Protestant missionaries in China
Christian missionaries in Fujian
American lexicographers
Reformed Church in America members
American Protestant missionaries
American expatriates in China
Missionary linguists
19th-century lexicographers